The IMOCA 60 Class yacht Safran, FRA 25 was designed by Lauriot-Prévost and G. Verdier and launched in the 2015 after being built CDK Technologies based in Lorient, France.

Racing results

Timeline

Safran, FRA 25 - Morgan Lagravière

Maitre Coq IV, FRA 17 - Yannick Bestaven

References 

Individual sailing yachts
2010s sailing yachts
Sailboat type designs by Guillaume Verdier
Sailing yachts designed by VPLP
Vendée Globe boats
IMOCA 60